Ji'an is a prefecture-level city in Jiangxi, China.

Ji'an may also refer to:

Places
 Ji'an County, a county in Ji'an City, Jiangxi, China
 Ji'an, Jilin, a county-level city in Tonghua, Jilin, China
 Ji-an, Hualien, a township in Hualien County, Taiwan

People with the given name
Tian Ji'an (–812), Tang Dynasty general

See also
Jian (disambiguation)
Ji'an railway station (disambiguation)